Al-Kholood Club is a Saudi Arabian football club based in Ar Rass. Founded in 1970, the club competes in the MS League , the second tier of Saudi football.

Stadium

Current squad 
As of 7 September 2021:

Out on loan

References

Kholood
Football clubs in Ar Rass
Association football clubs established in 1970
1970 establishments in Saudi Arabia